There are 62 Grade I listed buildings in South Yorkshire, England. In the United Kingdom, the term listed building refers to a building or other structure officially designated as being of special architectural, historical or cultural significance; Grade I structures are those considered to be "buildings of exceptional interest". In England, the authority for listing under the Planning (Listed Buildings and Conservation Areas) Act 1990 rests with Historic England, a non-departmental public body sponsored by the Department for Culture, Media and Sport.

Listing by metropolitan boroughs
The metropolitan county of South Yorkshire is made up of four metropolitan boroughs: Barnsley, Doncaster, Rotherham and Sheffield. The Grade I listed buildings in each borough are shown separately.

Barnsley

|}

Doncaster

|}

Rotherham

|}

Sheffield

|}

See also
:Category:Grade I listed buildings in South Yorkshire
Scheduled Monument
Conservation in the United Kingdom
Listed buildings in Sheffield
List of tallest buildings in Sheffield

Notes
Sometimes known as OSGB36, the grid reference is based on the British national grid reference system, and is the system used by the Ordnance Survey.
Images of England, funded by English Heritage and the Heritage Lottery Fund, is a photographic record of England's listed buildings, but it is not an up-to-date record. The listing status and descriptions shown are as at February 2001.

References

External links

 
 
South Yorkshire
Lists of listed buildings in South Yorkshire